The 1901–02 Northern Football League season was the thirteenth in the history of the Northern Football League, a football competition in Northern England.

Clubs

The league featured 9 clubs which competed in the last season, along with one new club: 
 Grangetown Athletic

League table

References

1901-02
1901–02 in English association football leagues